Google is a computer software and a web search engine company that acquired, on average, more than one company per week in 2010 and 2011. The table below is an incomplete list of acquisitions, with each acquisition listed being for the respective company in its entirety, unless otherwise specified. The acquisition date listed is the date of the agreement between Google and the acquisition subject. As Google is headquartered in the United States, acquisition is listed in US dollars. If the price of an acquisition is unlisted, then it is undisclosed. If the Google service that is derived from the acquired company is known, then it is also listed here. Google itself was re-organized into a subsidiary of a larger holding company known as Alphabet Inc. in 2015.

, Alphabet has acquired over 200 companies, with its largest acquisition being the purchase of Motorola Mobility, a mobile device manufacturing company, for $12.5 billion. Most of the firms acquired by Google are based in the United States, and, in turn, most of these are based in or around the San Francisco Bay Area. To date, Alphabet has divested itself of four business units: Frommers, which was sold back to Arthur Frommer in April 2012; SketchUp, which was sold to Trimble in April 2012, Boston Dynamics in early 2016 and Google Radio Automation, which was sold to WideOrbit in 2009.

Many Google products originated as services provided by companies that Google has since acquired. For example, Google's first acquisition was the Usenet company Deja News, and its services became Google Groups. Similarly, Google acquired Dodgeball, a social networking service company, and eventually replaced it with Google Latitude. Other acquisitions include web application company JotSpot, which became Google Sites; Voice over IP company GrandCentral, which became Google Voice; and video hosting service company Next New Networks, which became YouTube Next Lab and Audience Development Group. CEO Larry Page has explained that potential acquisition candidates must pass a sort of "toothbrush test": Are their products potentially useful once or twice a day, and do they improve your life?

Following the acquisition of Israel-based startup Waze in June 2013, Google submitted a 10-Q filing with the Securities Exchange Commission (SEC) that revealed that the corporation spent $1.3 billion on acquisitions during the first half of 2013, with $966 million of that total going to Waze.

Key acquisitions 
In October 2006, Google announced that it had acquired the video-sharing site YouTube for $1.65 billion in Google stock, and the deal was finalized on November 13, 2006.

On April 13, 2007, Google reached an agreement to acquire DoubleClick for $3.1 billion, transferring to Google valuable relationships that DoubleClick had with Web publishers and advertising agencies. The deal was approved despite anti-trust concerns raised by competitors Microsoft and AT&T.

On August 15, 2011, Google made its largest-ever acquisition to date when it announced that it would acquire Motorola Mobility for $12.5 billion subject to approval from regulators in the United States and Europe. This purchase was made in part to help Google gain Motorola's considerable patent portfolio on mobile phones and wireless technologies, to help protect Google in its ongoing patent disputes with other companies, mainly Apple and Microsoft, and to allow it to continue to freely offer Android. The merger was completed on May 22, 2012, after the approval of China.

In June 2013, Google acquired Waze, a $966 million deal. While Waze would remain an independent entity, its social features, such as its crowdsourced location platform, were reportedly valuable integrations between Waze and Google Maps, Google's own mapping service.

On January 26, 2014, Google announced it had agreed to acquire DeepMind Technologies, a privately held artificial intelligence company from London. DeepMind describes itself as having the ability to combine the best techniques from machine learning and systems neuroscience to build general-purpose learning algorithms. DeepMind's first commercial applications were used in simulations, e-commerce and games.  it was reported that DeepMind had roughly 75 employees. Technology news website Recode reported that the company was purchased for $400 million though it was not disclosed where the information came from. A Google spokesman would not comment on the price. The purchase of DeepMind aids in Google's recent growth in the artificial intelligence and robotics community.

List of mergers and acquisitions

Divestitures 
On December 10, 2012, Google sold the manufacturing operations of Motorola Mobility to Flextronics for $75 million. As a part of the agreement, Flextronics will manufacture undisclosed Android and other mobile devices. On December 19, 2012, Google sold the Motorola Home business division of Motorola Mobility to Arris Group for $2.35 billion in a cash-and-stock transaction. As a part of this deal, Google acquired a 15.7% stake in Arris Group valued at $300 million.

On January 29, 2014, Google announced that it would divest Motorola Mobility to Lenovo for $2.91 billion, a fraction of the original $12.5 billion price paid by Google to acquire the company. Google retained all but 2000 of Motorola's patents and entered into cross-licensing deals.

In 2017, Google sold off its satellite business, Terra Bella, to Planet Labs for an undisclosed price and entered into a multi-year agreement to license Earth imagery from the company.

See also 
 CapitalG, Alphabet's growth capital investment fund
 GV, Alphabet's venture capital firm
 List of largest mergers and acquisitions
 Lists of corporate acquisitions and mergers

References

External links 
 Google's subsidiaries – US Securities and Exchange Commission
 Google's Southern California acquisitions
 Google's acquisitions explained with visualization

 
Alphabet Inc. lists
Alphabet
Alphabet